Elisabeth Barbara Schmetterling (baptized 6 December 1801– 12 November 1882) was a Dutch artist.

Life and career 

The daughter of Antonia Blom and miniaturist , she was born in Amsterdam and grew up there. She was educated in art by her father. She also provided illustrations for children's books and the Nederlandsche Muzen-Almanak , an almanac. Around 1830, she began working on miniatures, doing portraits and copies of works by masters from the 17th century.

Schmetterling died in Amsterdam at the age of 80.

See also 
 List of Dutch painters

Notes

References 

1801 births
1882 deaths
Dutch women painters
Engravers from Amsterdam
Portrait miniaturists
Women engravers
Painters from Amsterdam
19th-century Dutch painters
19th-century engravers
19th-century Dutch women artists